Ravi Chopra (27 September 1946 – 12 November 2014) was an Indian director and producer.

Early life
Chopra was the son of producer and director B.R.Chopra and nephew of Yash Chopra. Aditya Chopra and Uday Chopra are his cousins.

Career

Film career 
Chopra started his career assisting his father B.R. Chopra in films like, Dastaan (1972) and Dhund (1973). He also assisted his uncle Yash Chopra in Ittefaq (1969). Eventually, he made his independent directorial debut with Zameer (1975), produced under the family banner, B. R. Films. In 1980, he directed the ensemble disaster film The Burning Train, which over the years is considered a cult classic. Other films he directed included Mazdoor (1983), Aaj Ki Awaaz, Dehleez (1986), 
Pratigyabadh, Kal Ki Awaz (1992). Then he, along with his father, directed TV series Mahabharat (1988–89)

Since 2006, the only movies Ravi produced after his father's death was Bhoothnath (2008) and Bhoothnath Returns (2013). Ravi Chopra was served with a legal notice in 2009 by 20th Century Fox, which charged that his upcoming movie Banda Yeh Bindaas Hai blatantly plagiarized the 1992 comedy My Cousin Vinny. Chopra and the production company, Mumbai-based BR Films, denied the charges in court in May 2009; the movie's release was to be delayed until June 2009 by order of the Bombay High Court. Fox sought damages of $1.4 million; this was the first time a Bollywood filmmaker was taken to court by a Hollywood company over the remaking of a film. Fox had given Chopra permission "to make a film loosely based on the Oscar-winning movie" but concluded the final product was a "substantial reproduction" of the original. The film has remained unreleased even after Ravi Chopra's death in 2014.

Television career 
Ravi directed the highly successful television serial Mahabharat, which aired during 1988–1990, and the television mini-series, Ramayan, which was aired in 2002. He also directed mythological shows like Vishnu Puran and Ma Shakti. His TV series Aap Beeti was one of the most popular TV show on Doordarshan National in the early 2000s.

Death
On 23 October 2012, he was diagnosed with a severe lung ailment and was discharged from Breach Candy hospital after a week. "He was discharged from hospital on October 26," hospital sources said, without going into details. He was being treated for lung cancer at CMC Vellore. Chopra died on 12 November 2014 at Breach Candy Hospital in Mumbai where he had been admitted a few days earlier for a lung ailment. He was 68 years old, and survived by his wife and two children.

Filmography

Films

Television shows

References

External links
 

1946 births
2014 deaths
20th-century Indian film directors
21st-century Indian film directors
Deaths from lung disease
Film directors from Mumbai
Film producers from Mumbai
Hindi-language film directors
Indian television directors